Norval Eugene Richardson (January 26, 1928 – August 1, 1997) was an American Negro league pitcher in the 1940s and 1950s.

A native of San Diego, California, Richardson attended San Diego High School, and made his Negro leagues debut in 1947 for the Kansas City Monarchs. A lefty with a good curve and control, he pitched for the Monarchs through 1950, then pitched one season for the Baltimore Elite Giants before finishing his career back in Kansas City for two final seasons. He died in San Diego in 1997 at age 69.

References

External links
 and Seamheads
 Gene Richardson at Negro Leagues Baseball Museum

1928 births
1997 deaths
Baltimore Elite Giants players
Kansas City Monarchs players
20th-century African-American sportspeople
Baseball pitchers

San Diego High School alumni